Villa!! is a 1958 American Western film directed by James B. Clark, written by Louis Vittes, and starring Brian Keith, Cesar Romero, Margia Dean, Rodolfo Hoyos Jr., Carlos Múzquiz and Mario Navarro. The film was released in October 1958, by 20th Century Fox.

Plot

Cast  
Brian Keith as Bill Harmon
Cesar Romero as Tomás Lopez
Margia Dean as Julie
Rodolfo Hoyos Jr. as Pancho Villa
Carlos Múzquiz as Cabo
Mario Navarro as Pajarito
Ben Wright as Francisco Madero
Elisa Loti as Manuela
Enrique Lucero as Tenorio
Rosenda Monteros as Marianna Villa
Félix González as Don Octavio
José Espinoza as Posado
Rafael Alcayde as Don Alfonso
Alberto Gutiérrez as Major Domo
José Treviño as Capt. Castillo
José Chávez as Col. Martinez 
Jorge Russek as Rurale Lieutenant
Guillermo Álvarez Bianchi as Julie's Car Driver
Gisela Martínez as Flamenco Dancer
Lamberto Gayou as Perez
Lee Morgan as Rancher
Ricardo Adalid as First Villager
Paul Arnett as Second Villager 
Raphael J. Sevilla as Carlos 
Carlos Guarneros as Comic Dancer
Eduardo Pliego as Mayor
Yolanda del Valle as Pretty Girl 
Alberto Pedret as Mexican Detective with Harmon

Production
The film was originally called The Pancho Villa Story.

The film was shot back to back with Sierra Baron in Mexico, in and around Cherabusco Studios in Mexico City.

Pedro Armendáriz was meant to play Pancho Villa but he was replaced by Rodolfo Hoyos.

Margia Dean recalled the director "was a former film editor. He’d fill the camera with pictorial things, unnatural things. Brian Keith and I had a love scene, but I had my back to him—we couldn’t look into each other's eyes. That director was shooting for the scenery. He made it uncomfortable, and thus made it hard to be convincing. I remember they built this Indian village—and a portable toilet. One fella in the cast was urinating and the thing blew away. Cesar Romero was... the only one good in the picture—I didn’t like myself or Brian Keith, but of course we had the terrible direction."

References

External links 
 

1958 films
American Western (genre) films
1958 Western (genre) films
20th Century Fox films
CinemaScope films
Films about Pancho Villa
Films directed by James B. Clark
Films shot in Mexico
Films scored by Paul Sawtell
1950s English-language films
1950s American films